Torture Garden may refer to:

 The Torture Garden (novel), novel by Octave Mirbeau
 "The Torture Garden", song by Death in June
 Torture Garden (album), album by Naked City
 Torture Garden (film),  film directed by Freddie Francis and written by Robert Bloch
 Torture Garden (fetish club), London fetish nightclub